Secrets of a Sorority Girl is a 1946 American crime film directed by Lew Landers and Frank Wisbar and written by George Wallace Sayre and Arthur St. Claire. The film stars Mary Ware, Rick Vallin, Addison Richards, Ray Walker, Marie Harmon and Caren Marsh. The film was released on August 15, 1945, by Producers Releasing Corporation.

Plot

Cast       
Mary Ware as Linda Hamilton
Rick Vallin as Paul Reynolds
Addison Richards as John Hamilton
Ray Walker as Whitey King
Marie Harmon as Judy O'Neill
Caren Marsh Doll as Audrey Scott
Mary Kenyon as Barbara Chase
Marilyn Johnson as Jeannie Cooper
Rosemonde James as Carol Miller
Mauritz Hugo as Charles Stevens
Emmett Vogan as Joseph Kelland
Frank Ferguson as Justin Farley
Anthony Warde as Nick Vegas
William Murphy as Andy Jones
Pierre Watkin as Dr. Harlan Johnson
Bobo Scharfe as Gangster

References

External links
 

1945 films
American crime films
1945 crime films
Producers Releasing Corporation films
Films directed by Lew Landers
Films directed by Frank Wisbar
American black-and-white films
Films set in universities and colleges
Films about fraternities and sororities
1940s English-language films
1940s American films